Michael Hitchcock (born July 28, 1958) is an American actor, comedian, screenwriter, and television producer.

Early life
Hitchcock received his Bachelor of Science degree from Northwestern University and a Master of Fine Arts degree from the University of California, Los Angeles. He is a graduate of Lyons Township High School in LaGrange, Illinois.

Career
Hitchcock was a writer and executive producer on seasons 3 and 4 of the CW television series Crazy Ex-Girlfriend. He also served as a writer and co-executive producer on seasons 1 and 2. In addition, he has played the role of water conspiracy theorist Bert.

Hitchcock served as a writer and co-executive producer on seasons 5 and 6 of the FOX television series Glee. Hitchcock served as a writer and supervising producer on season 4, and became a writer and consulting producer for season 3 of the show after previously appearing in a guest role season 1 as rival glee club director Dalton Rumba. Hitchcock reprised this role in the season 4 episode "Makeover", season 5 episode "Love Love Love" and season 6 episode "The Hurt Locker, Part Two".  In addition, Hitchcock directed the season 6 episode "Child Star".

As an actor, he has appeared in several of Christopher Guest's critically acclaimed movies, including Waiting for Guffman (1996), Best in Show (2000), A Mighty Wind (2003), For Your Consideration (2006), and Mascots (2016). Hitchcock and his co-actors from A Mighty Wind were awarded “Best Ensemble Cast” by  Florida Film Critics Circle and were nominated for “Best Ensemble Acting” by the Phoenix Film Critics Society.

Other film appearances include Magic Camp (2020), Bridesmaids (2011), Super 8 (2011), Operation: Endgame (2010), Smiley Face, Wild Hogs (2007), Joss Whedon's Serenity (2005), Pretty Persuasion (2005), Bug (2002),  Heartbreakers (2001), and Happy, Texas (1999).

Besides recurring roles on Crazy Ex-Girlfriend and Glee, Hitchcock has also recurred on Black Monday, The New Normal, United States of Tara, Men of a Certain Age, Party Down,  MADtv, and Grosse Pointe.

Other roles in television series include Space Force, The Goldbergs, People of Earth , Veep , Curb Your Enthusiasm, Nobodies, Idiotsitter, Tom Goes to the Mayor, Up All Night, Entourage, The League, The Glee Project, Pushing Daisies, Arrested Development, Head Case, The Suite Life on Deck, Las Vegas, and Desperate Housewives.

In 1999, Hitchcock became a writer for the FOX late-night comedy series MADtv, and became one of the series' producers in 2001. He also played the role of Simeon Dyson, an obnoxious, drug-abusing game show announcer on the recurring MADtv sketch, "The Lillian Verner Game Show." During his tenure, the MADtv writing team was nominated for three Writers Guild of America Awards in the Comedy/Variety category (in 2003, 2004, and 2005).

Hitchcock's other writing credits include the comedy films House Arrest (1996), and The Ultimate Christmas Present (2000) as well as the critically acclaimed drama Where the Day Takes You (1992), which marked the film acting debut of Will Smith and also featured Dermot Mulroney, Lara Flynn Boyle, Sean Astin, Balthazar Getty, and Christian Slater. Where the Day Takes You was nominated for the "Critics Award" at the Deauville Film Festival, and Mulroney won "Best Actor" at the Seattle International Film Festival.

Hitchcock is an alumnus of The Groundlings, a Los Angeles-based improvisational and sketch comedy theater troupe. Although he retired from the theatre's Main Stage Company in the mid 1990s, Hitchcock still comes back regularly to perform in The Groundlings’ all-improv shows Cookin' with Gas and The Crazy Uncle Joe Show.

In 2008, he was inducted into the Lyons Township High School Hall of Fame.

References

External links

 

1958 births
Male actors from Ohio
American male comedians
American male screenwriters
American male television actors
Television producers from Ohio
American television writers
Living people
People from Defiance, Ohio
American male television writers
Comedians from Ohio
Screenwriters from Ohio